Atzenbrugg is a municipality in the district of Tulln in the Austrian state of Lower Austria. The composer Franz Schubert used to spend some time in Atzenbrugg in the summers around 1820.

Population

References

External links 

Cities and towns in Tulln District
Cadastral community of Tulln District